Ramkrishna Nagar, most commonly known as R.K Nagar is a small municipality township situated around 47km from Karimganj, India. The topography of the area comprises undulating hillocks. It is well connected by bus service from Karimganj and shared taxis run by private operators.

This town is under jurisdiction of Karimganj and having a sub divisional office. The only institution for higher education is Ramkrishna Nagar college which opened in 1964. Now it offers courses in science and humanities to the people of this locality and also students from nearby places. There is a small town under this called Kadamtala about 2 km from Ramkrishna Nagar. Access to this place is from Hailakandi, Silchar, and other places by bus route is available. It is possible to get a train from Anipur Railway Station, approximately 5 km away from the main town.

Demographics

Majority of the population of Ramkrishna Nagar are Bengali speaking Hindus . There is a considerable population of Bishnupriya Manipuris and Muslims .

Geography
The place is mostly covered by small altitude hills. There are also some green tea gardens near the town.

Education
Ramakrishna Nagar has a number of government as well as private schools at both primary as well as secondary level. Schools in the area include Ramkrishna Vidyapith H.S School, Kadamtala High School, Girls High School, G.C Paul Memorial Academy, Dreamland High School, Ideal home English Medium High School, Saraswasti Vidyamandir High school, Jawahar Navodaya Vidyalaya, etc.
Recently Ramkrishna Nagar junior College was opened which is privately funded institute and the stream of commerce was introduced in 10+2 level in Ramkrishna Nagar for the first time. For degree courses there is one college which is Ramkrishna Nagar college which provides degree courses in science and humanities which is affiliated to Assam university which provides pass and honours courses in various stream. There is also one private college named G.C Paul College of Education situated 3-4 km away from main town which provides B.Ed.,D.el.ed degree courses in Arts, This institution along with G.C Paul Memorial Academy (school) was founded by former Ramkrishna Nagar College Principal, Mr. K.R Ranjan Paul.

Local events and festivals
Viking Fair and Book fairs are held regularly at R.K Nagar. Every year Durga Puja is celebrated with large gatherings of people. On the occasion of Independence Day and Republic Day, a march-past (parade) is performed by the 4th Assam NCC Unit cadets of Ramkrishna Nagar College along with the police officers and selected students of the local schools in front of the Circle Officer and Officer-in-charge of Police.

Sport
Inter-state Football championships are famous in Ramkrishna Nagar. Teams from Tripura, Bangladesh, Shillong also participate in the events. Inter-school football matches and local matches are also played on regular basis. Red ball cricket is also popular in Ramkrishna Nagar. Nowadays, Women football matches are also played. All these matches are played in Netaji Baag, Ramkrishna Nagar.

Amenities
It Has a basic primary health care center with Ambulances. The area also has its own police Station which was established in 1994 and a fire brigade station. A new Petrol Pump of IOCL named M/S Yashoda & Sons Energy Station was established on 1 December 2020. The Pump was inaugurated by Honorable MP, Shri Kripanath Mallah in presence of dignitaries of IOCL and local people. It is the 1st Petrol Pump of Ramkrishnanagar and brought to people much respite. The Pump offers Free Air, cleaned Toilet, Free Parking and Lubricants sales along with usual Petrol and Diesel.

See also 
 Ratabari Vidhan Sabha

Cities and towns in Karimganj district
Karimganj